is a 2014 Japanese drama film directed by Daisaku Kimura. It was released on 14 June 2014.

Plot
Tōru, a struggling securities trader in Tokyo, learns that his father Isao has died in a mountain rescue operation. He returns to his home town in the mountains of central Japan for the wake. He spontaneously decides to quit his prestigious job and take over the remote mountain hut that Isao operated during the summer season. Helping him are Ai, a young woman who's an excellent cook, and Goro, a somewhat mysterious friend of Isao's.

Tōru struggles at first, but soon comes to appreciate the magnificent environment and the camaraderie among the mountain enthusiasts who come to visit. His newfound solace is put to a test when Goro suffers a stroke and needs to be carried down the mountain quickly or risk lasting damage.

Cast
Kenichi Matsuyama as Tōru Nagamine
Yū Aoi as Ai Takazawa
Etsushi Toyokawa as Goro Tada
Kaoru Kobayashi as Isao Nagamine

Reception
The film has grossed ¥95.2 million in Japan.

References

External links
 

2014 drama films
Films directed by Daisaku Kimura
Japanese drama films
Mountaineering films
Mountaineering books
2010s Japanese films
2010s Japanese-language films